This is a list of Slovenian playwrights.

B 
Peter Božič (1932–2009)

C 
Ivan Cankar (1876–1918)

Č 
Tone Čufar (1905–1942)

F 
Fran Saleški Finžgar (1871–1962)

J 
Drago Jančar (born 1948)
Jože Javoršek (1920–1990)
Dušan Jovanović (born 1939)

K 
Primož Kozak (1929–1990)
Bratko Kreft (1905–1996)
France Kunstelj (1914–1945)

L 
Fran Levstik (1831–1887)
Anton Tomaž Linhart (1756–1795)

M 
Karel Mauser (1918–1977)
Vinko Möderndorfer (born 1958)

N 
Anton Novačan (1887–1951)
Boris A. Novak (born 1953)

P 
Tone Partljič (born 1940)
Žarko Petan (born 1929)
Ivan Potrč (1913–1993)

R 
Marjan Rožanc (1930–1990)

S 
Dominik Smole (1929–1992)
Gregor Strniša (1930–1987)

Z 
Dane Zajc (1929–2005)

Ž 
Oton Župančič (1878–1949)

 
Slovenian
Playwrights